Robert Jenkins Dale (31 October 1931 – 2007), born in Irlam, Lancashire, was a professional footballer who played as a wing half. He played for Altrincham in non-league football, and played league football for Bury and Colchester United before retired through ill health.

References

External links

Bob Dale Career Stats at coludata.co.uk

1931 births
2007 deaths
English footballers
Association football wing halves
People from Irlam
Colchester United F.C. players
Bury F.C. players
Altrincham F.C. players